The Dummy is a 1917 American drama silent film directed by Francis J. Grandon and written by Harriet Ford, Harvey J. O'Higgins and Eve Unsell. The film stars Jack Pickford, Frank Losee, Edwin Stanley, Helen Greene, Ethelmary Oakland and Ruby Hoffman. The film was released on March 19, 1917, by Paramount Pictures.

Plot

Cast 
Jack Pickford as Barney Cook
Frank Losee as Babbings
Edwin Stanley as Mr. Meredith
Helen Greene as Mrs. Meredith
Ethelmary Oakland as Beryl Meredith
Ruby Hoffman as Rosie Hart
Hal Wilson

References

External links 
 

1917 films
1910s English-language films
Silent American drama films
1917 drama films
Paramount Pictures films
Films directed by Francis J. Grandon
American black-and-white films
American silent feature films
1910s American films